Krzysztof Jassem (born 1965) is a Polish bridge player.

Bridge accomplishments

Awards

 Mott-Smith Trophy (1) 2008

Wins

 North American Bridge Championships (1)
 Vanderbilt (1) 2008

Runners-up

 World Transnational Open Teams Championship (1) 1997 
 World Olympiad Teams Championship (1) 2000
 North American Bridge Championships (2)
 Fast Open Pairs (2) 2013, 2014

References

External links
 
 

1965 births
Living people
Polish contract bridge players
Place of birth missing (living people)